The ThinkPad T series is a line of laptop computers. Originally developed by IBM, and introduced in 2000, the brand was sold along with the rest of IBM's consumer computer division to  Chinese technology company Lenovo in 2005, who have continued to produce and market succeeding models.

History
IBM introduced the T series as part of their ThinkPad brand in 2000. The laptop was meant to cater to users working with multiple networks and in different environments. This resulted in the development of the IBM Embedded Security Subsystem.
From the time of its inception, the series was designed to balance speed and mobility. Despite a 14.1-inch screen, similar to desktops at the time, the titanium composite body on the laptop was designed to keep the weight as low as possible. Users were also given options to swap components for mobility, like a DVD player, writeable CD drive or numeric keypads.

The ThinkPad T20 was released by IBM as the 14.1-inch successor to the 13.3-inch ThinkPad 600 laptops.

In October 2000, the ThinkPad T20 was upgraded and released as the ThinkPad T21 laptop with the Intel Mobile Pentium III (800 MHz) CPU. The hard disk space offered was a 32GBhigh for the time.

Further minor refinements were made to the T2X series resulting in the T22 and finally in 2002 with the T23 a Pentium III-M 1.13 GHz "Tualatin" having 128MiB of RAM and a 30GB hard drive.

The ThinkPad T30 was released in May 2002, with options for the Intel Mobile Pentium 4-M processor with the Intel 845MP Mobile Chipset. This was complemented by a 60 GB hard drive and a DVD-ROM/CD-RW combo drive, making it a powerful laptop.Announced in March 2003, the ThinkPad T40p represented the first in the T series' "performance" class of laptops. The ThinkPad T40p offered ATI Mobility 9000 with 64 MiB VRAM, a 14.1-inch LCD display with  resolution, a maximum of 2 GiB PC2100 RAM, and a 60 GB IDE hard disk. The design was followed by the T41 and T41p and the T42 and T42p (ATI Mobility 7500, 9600, and FireGL T2), with almost complete parts interchangeability, except for the fan (normal or p-series), keyboard (14.1" or 15"), screen (14.1" or 15"), and screen inverter. The 15-inch T42 and T42p models were offered with an optional  or  "FlexView" IPS LCD display.

Launched in April 2005, the ThinkPad T43 and T43p laptops were the last T-series laptops manufactured for IBM. The major improvement was a move to lower-cost DDR2 RAM and a bus speed increase from 400 MHz to 533 MHz. The CPU also was the first to have the XD bit, making it the first Thinkpad that could run Windows 8.x and Windows 10.

In December 2004 Lenovo announced the acquisition of the IBM PC division including the ThinkPad brand (at the time, 40% of the PC division was working in China.) ThinkPads were being made by Lenovo's arch-rival Great Wall Technology.

Lenovo released the ThinkPad T60 and T60p laptops in February 2006. While designed and manufactured by Lenovo, the T60 and the T60p still featured the IBM logo on the machines. In May 2007, the T61 and T61p laptops slowly phased out IBM logos in favor of the ThinkPad logo. It also was the first T Series notebook to adopt widescreen resolution as a mainstream option; the traditional 4:3 aspect ratio screens was also offered as an alternative at the time but mass industry adoption of the widescreen standard meant that it was the last ThinkPad of its kind to use the 4:3 standard.

The naming convention for the T Series was changed by Lenovo following the release of the ThinkPad T400 and T500 in July 2008. The Txxp models (like the T61p) were replaced by Lenovo's ThinkPad W Series laptops. Designed as mobile workstations, the W series grew to become Lenovo's line of performance-oriented laptops. The T series remains Lenovo's premier line of laptops, aimed at corporate and enterprise users and is praised by users for its outstanding Linux compatibility. The T-p lineup later returned as an irregular T##0p line with only T440p, T460p, T470p and T540p models.

The Lenovo ThinkPad 25th anniversary edition was released on Oct. 5, 2017. It was based on the ThinkPad T470, but brought back the classic 7-row keyboard.
In 2018, Lenovo introduced the ThinkPad A485, which officially is not part of the T Series, but it shares the same housing as the T480. It offers a 2nd generation AMD Ryzen Pro processor and lacks Thunderbolt 3 support, but has USB-C support. The A475 had been similarly released in 2017 as a variation of the T470, but with AMD Carrizo or Bristol Ridge processors. In 2019 Lenovo officially introduced AMD CPUs in the T Series, and differentiated it with the digit 5 at the end of the model number (i.e. T495). 

From 2020 onwards, the naming scheme was changed again, with the letter "T" followed by the screen size in inches, then the Generation number and the screen size and CPU manufacturer in brackets (e.g. T14s Gen 2 (14" Intel), T16 Gen 1 (16" AMD)), similar to the scheme used by the X1 series.

Specifications

Recent 14-inch models are:

Recent 15-inch models available from Lenovo are:

Reviews

PCWorld said that the ThinkPad T20 “packs a bigger screen, a more comfortable keyboard, and a larger set of useful features into a smaller package than any of its competitors.” The Web site epinions.com said that the ThinkPad T20 was “worth the wait” giving it 4.5 stars out of 5.

In a review of the ThinkPad T60, Notebook Review called the T-series laptops the “flagship of the ThinkPad brand”, aimed at corporate professionals. Some of the T-series characteristics as listed by notebookreview.com include durability, security, usability, and performance.

The ThinkPad T410 was awarded 4.5 out of 5 stars by Notebook Review upon release. The review noted the centering of the screen, eliminating the thick bezel on one side and the thin bezel on the other. The review indicated that the pros were the speed, battery life, and wide selection of ports. The cons were minor distortions on the screen when flexed, and the high pitched fan. WIRED also reviewed the T410 laptop positively, saying that “Lenovo's thoughtful ThinkPad is a near-perfect machine”.

The PC Advisor review of the ThinkPad T510 called the lack of alterations to the traditional design a good thing. It also highlighted the professional appearance and ‘sturdy build quality’, indicating that this makes the laptop stand out from others in the market.

The T420 and T520 laptops were different from their predecessors mainly through an upgrade to Intel's Sandy Bridge processors. The T420 received a total score of 85% from the Notebook Check web site. The fan noise was noticeably reduced, as indicated by a reviewer from PCWorld. The T-series laptops, the T420, the T420s, and the T520, have been lauded for their battery life – up to 30 hours with a 9-cell battery slice.

Gallery

References

External links

 
 ThinkPad T Series at Thinkwiki.org, Linux guides to Thinkpads

IBM laptops
Lenovo laptops
T series
Computer-related introductions in 2000